Kirara may refer to:

 , Japanese sprinter
 , Japanese model and former adult video actress
 Kirara (InuYasha), a character in the manga series InuYasha
 Kirara (manga), a manga by Toshiki Yui that was also adapted into an OVA
 "Kirara" (song), a 1998 song by Shizuka Kudō
 Kirara Beach, Shimane
 Kirara Beach, Yamaguchi
 Kirara: Ano Ang Kulay ng Pag-ibig?, a Philippine television drama series 
 Kirara Hazama, a character in Assassination Classroom

See also
 Manga Time Kirara, a manga magazine published by Houbunsha

Japanese unisex given names